Jordi Masó Ribas (born 19 September 1992) is a Spanish footballer who plays for UE Olot. Mainly a  central midfielder, he can also play as a right back.

Club career
Born in Fontcoberta, Girona, Catalonia, Masó finished his development with Girona FC. On 16 April 2010, while still a junior, he made his professional debut, coming in as a late substitute in a 0–4 away loss against Levante UD in the Segunda División; he was almost exclusively associated to the youth squad during his spell, however.

In summer 2010, Masó joined FC Barcelona, being initially assigned to the juniors. However, he did appear once with the B-team, playing the last 19 minutes in a 3–2 second level away win over Rayo Vallecano on 4 June 2011. He was released in late July, signing for Segunda División B club UE Llagostera shortly after.

Masó quickly established himself as a regular starter for his new club, being converted to a right back in the process. On 11 March 2015 he signed a contract extension with the Blanquivermells, penning a deal until 2017.

References

External links

1992 births
Living people
Spanish footballers
Footballers from Catalonia
Association football defenders
Association football midfielders
Association football utility players
Segunda División players
Segunda División B players
Girona FC players
FC Barcelona Atlètic players
UE Costa Brava players
UE Olot players